Lingua Nostra is a peer-reviewed academic journal of general linguistics published by Le Lettere. The journal publishes both articles and book reviews. It publishes two special issues a year. The current editors-in-chief are Migliorini S. and Devoto G. Since 2010, it publishes 1400 pages per year.

History
The journal has been published since 1935.

Abstracting and indexing 
The journal is abstracted and indexed in:

The journal has a Thomson Reuters 2015 impact factor of 0.763 and a 5-year impact factor of 0.872.

References

External links 
 

Linguistics journals
Italian-language journals
Publications established in 1935